Children Running Through is Patty Griffin's sixth commercially released album, and fifth studio album.

The album debuted at number 34 on the Billboard 200 in mid-February, the highest chart position achieved by Griffin in her career. It sold about 27,000 copies in its first week. As of January 2010, the album had sold over 168,000 copies in the United States.

Kelly Clarkson performed a live cover version of "Up To The Mountain (MLK Song)" with Jeff Beck on the "Idol Gives Back" special edition of American Idol on April 25, 2007. Griffin is regarded as one of Clarkson's musical inspirations and Clarkson also covered "No Bad News" during the Nashville concert on her My December Tour. Bonus track "Moon Song" was covered by Griffin's close friend Emmylou Harris on her 2008 album All I Intended to Be.

Reception 

Pittsburgh Post-Gazette said the song "Heavenly Day" gives "Griffin a chance to let that fine voice soar." According to Entertainment Weekly Griffin "effortlessly slow-burns her way through an evocation of good times."

The album was nominated for a Grammy Award for Best Contemporary Folk/Americana Album.

Griffin won Album of the Year and Artist of the Year award at the 2007 Americana Music Honors & Awards ceremony and is one of only three female artists to win the latter (with Griffin being the second after Loretta Lynn in 2005 and Gillian Welch following in 2012).

Track listing 
All songs written by Patty Griffin.

Personnel 

 David Angell – Violin
 Kristen Cassel – Cello
 David Davidson – Violin
 Christopher Farrell – Viola
 Traci Goudie – Art Direction, Design
 Patty Griffin – Acoustic Guitar, Piano, Producer, Vox Organ, Drawing
 Emmylou Harris – Background Vocals on "Trapeze" 
 Jim Hoke – Baritone & Tenor Saxophone, Bass Harmonica
 Anthony LaMarchina – Cello
 Doug Lancio – Guitar, Autoharp
 JD Foster - Bass
 Michael Longoria – Percussion, Drums
 Mike McCarthy – Producer
 Ian McLagan – Grand Piano
 John Mark Painter – Horn, Horn Arrangements, String Arrangements
 Leslie Richter – Engineer
 Jane Scarpantoni – Cello, Soloist
 Pamela Sixfin – Violin
 Steve Squire – Second Engineer
 Mary Kathryn Vanosdale – Violin
 Jim Vollentine – Engineer
 Kathi Whitley – Production Coordination
 Kristin Wilkinson – Viola
 Glenn Worf – Bass, Tic Tac

References 

2007 albums
Patty Griffin albums